Pyotr Petrovich Sokolov (Russian: Пётр Петрович Соколов, 16 December 1890 (OS)/28 December 1890 (NS) – 11 May 1971) was a Russian football player who competed in the 1912 Summer Olympics. He was also a spy.

He was a member of the Russian Olympic squad and played one match in the main tournament as well as one match in the consolation tournament.

After the Russian Revolution of 1917 he did not accept the Soviet regime. He was recruited by the British Secret Service Bureau and became a spy. He was sent to Finland, where he tried to struggle against Bolsheviks. In 1936, he received Finnish citizenship, and, during World War II, he served in the Finnish Defence Forces in the Winter War and Continuation War. After the Continuation War, the Soviet counterespionage tried to eliminate him but he was able to flee to Sweden in September 1944. He changed his name to Peter Sahlin and remained living in Enköping near Stockholm.

References

External links
profile 

1890 births
1971 deaths
Russian footballers
Russia international footballers
Footballers at the 1912 Summer Olympics
Olympic footballers of Russia
Association football defenders
Finnish emigrants to Sweden
Finnish military personnel of World War II
Finnish refugees
Naturalized citizens of Finland
Refugees in Sweden
Russian emigrants to Sweden
Secret Intelligence Service personnel
White Russian emigrants to Finland